Tobi 28 - Coptic Calendar - Tobi 30

The twenty-ninth day of the Coptic month of Tobi, the fifth month of the Coptic year. On a common year, this day corresponds to January 24, of the Julian Calendar, and February 6, of the Gregorian Calendar. This day falls in the Coptic Season of Shemu, the season of the Harvest.

Commemorations

Saints 

 The departure of Saint Xene 
 The departure of Saint Syriacus the Struggle Mantled

References 

Days of the Coptic calendar